Lindenstrauss is a surname. Notable people with the surname include:

Joram Lindenstrauss, Israeli mathematician
Micha Lindenstrauss, Israeli judge
Elon Lindenstrauss, Israeli mathematician

Jewish surnames